Marine View is an unincorporated community and census-designated place (CDP) in Grant County, Washington, United States. As of the 2020 census, it had a population of 405.

The CDP is in the southeast part of the county, at the northern base of the Frenchman Hills, on the south side of Washington State Route 262. Potholes Reservoir and Potholes State Park are to the north across the state highway.

References 

Populated places in Grant County, Washington
Census-designated places in Grant County, Washington
Census-designated places in Washington (state)